The Chaskaman Dam is one of the important dams of Maharashtra and is built on the Bhima River at Rajgurunagar in Pune district. It is located across river Bhima in Krishna basin near Village Bibi in Khed taluka. The main purpose of this dam was to improve irrigation and supply of electricity to the nearby villages. It is the second Hydel Greenfield power project in the country that is capable of captive power as well. The power will be utilized through the state power board. The project is completed during 2008-09.

Details
In the year 1977, the Chas Kaman Irrigation project was approved by the Planning Commission of India. The budget of Rs. 22.47 Crore was approved for building this irrigation and hydroelectric project. This project construction was started in the month of July in year 2002. The final cost of completion of the dam is believed to be around Rs.388 crores.  The dam is about 738 meters in length and the masonry dam of 220 meters length. The maximum height of the dam from its lowest foundation level is approximately 46 meters. The dam has five radial gates with a spillway of approximately 72 meters. The reservoir holds about 241 MCM of water of which 214 MCM is approved for use for irrigation purpose. The depth of the dam is about 150 meters. The capacity of Chas Kaman Dam to irrigate about 32824 ha of land of the villages nearby in Pune district. The dam and the surrounding areas receive rainfall from southwest monsoon from the month of June to September.  It is having minimum down level of the 634 meters and is designed to generate about six million power units. During the time of monsoons, it will be having 250 MCM storage capacities. In fact, this is being used for drinking as well as irrigation.

Places nearby
 Bhimashankar Wildlife Sanctuary
 The Jyotirling at Bhimashankar

See also

 Dams in Maharashtra
 List of power stations in India
 List of conventional hydroelectric power stations

References

External links 

Dams in Pune district
Gravity dams
Dams in Western Ghats
2002  establishments in Maharashtra
Dams completed in 2002